The men's decathlon at the 2019 World Athletics Championships was held at the Khalifa International Stadium in Doha from 2 to 4 October.

Because of the timetable, with the last competition finishing after midnight local time on 4 October, the technical rules of decathlon were modified: since this edition, the decathlon has to be completed in a period of two 24 hours rather than over two consecutive days as before. Niklas Kaul was the winner of the competition.

Records
Before the competition records were as follows:

Qualification standard
The standard to qualify automatically for entry was 8200 points.

Schedule
The event schedule, in local time (UTC+3), was as follows:

Results

100 metres
The 100 metres event started on 2 October at 16:35.

Long jump
The long jump event started on 2 October at 17:30.

Shot put
The shot put event started on 2 October at 18:50.

High jump
The high jump event started on 2 October at 18:50.

400 metres
The 400 metres event started on 2 October at 18:50.

110 metres hurdles
The 110 metres hurdles event started on 3 October at 16:35.

Discus throw
The discus throw event started on 3 October at 17:30.

Pole vault
The pole vault event started on 3 October at 19:05.

Javelin throw
The javelin throw event started on 3 October at 22:07.

1500 metres
The 1500 metres event started on 4 October at 00:32.

Final standings
The final standings were as follows:

References

Decathlon
Decathlon at the World Athletics Championships